These are the official results of the Women's Discus Throw event at the 2003 World Championships in Paris, France. There were a total number of 20 participating athletes, with the final held on Monday 25 August 2003.

Medalists

Schedule
All times are Central European Time (UTC+1)

Abbreviations
All results shown are in metres

Qualification

Final

References
 Results

J
Discus throw at the World Athletics Championships
2003 in women's athletics